Thunder Mask (サンダーマスク Sandā Masuku) is a 1972 tokusatsu series produced by Nippon Television. An adaptation by Osamu Tezuka was serialized in Shogakukan's Weekly Shōnen Sunday from 1972 to 1973.

Plot
Thunder Stars Commonwealth, who knew the ambition of Earth invasion of the Dark Space Deakanda, dispatched a warrior to the earth to prevent it. However, he mistakenly arrived at the earth 10,000 years ago, so he slept with a time capsule after leaving behind the old document that a monster appeared after 10,000 years and the key to wake up to sleep. 
And after 10,000 years, the Thunder Mask woke up from sleep at the end of the efforts to sacrifice the lives of the three doctors of Japan called the three biggest brains of Japan against the raids of the Deakanda, appearing at Koichi youth scientist Change, and cooperate with the science patrol squad to throw themselves into the fight with the demonic monsters.

Episodes
Behold! Akatsuki's Two Step Makeover
A boy who puts out devils
The spirit of the fire
Demon frozen operation
Vampire half-fish people's revenge
Tokyo desert Hakaider
Suck on Earth's oil
Eat Jumbo Jet!!
Put a hole in the earth!
Dorotrono! Bones in humans
It's ambush for the devils
Cruel! Thunder mask capital punishment
At the end of the far away galaxy
Breaking down demon animals
It is a steam whistle of death Degon H
A reviving descender
Radio Demon Delegation
The Devil Battery Electric Strikes Back
Thunder mask insanity
Immortal beasts Gataviran
Go for it in the ashes of death!
It is dangerous! Your toy is a monster!
Ghost story! Vampire and fog night
Save the frozen panties!
Great reversal! Ironman No. 13
Farewell, the brave brilliant star

References

1972 Japanese television series debuts
1973 Japanese television series endings
Tokusatsu television series